These are the official results of the Women's Javelin Throw event at the 2003 World Championships in Paris, France. There were a total number of 24 participating athletes, with the final held on Saturday 30 August 2003. The qualification mark was set at 60.00 metres.

Medalists

Schedule
All times are Central European Time (UTC+1)

Abbreviations
All results shown are in metres

Records

Startlist

Qualification

Group A

Group B

Final

See also
Athletics at the 2003 Pan American Games – Women's javelin throw 
Athletics at the 2004 Summer Olympics – Women's javelin throw

References
 Results
 todor66

J
Javelin throw at the World Athletics Championships
2003 in women's athletics